Chorizanthe corrugata is a species of flowering plant in the buckwheat family known by the common name wrinkled spineflower. It is native to the Mojave and Sonoran Deserts of the southwestern United States and two states of northwest Mexico, Baja California and Sonora.

Description
Chorizanthe corrugata is an erect, branching herb growing to a maximum height near half a meter. Most of the rounded or oval leaves are located about the base of the plant, each up to 2 centimeters long.

The inflorescence is made up of a cluster of flowers, each opening from a cylindrical, tubular involucre in shades of green or tan. The plant can be identified by the transversely corrugated surface of this involucral tube. Along the top edge of the tube are three narrow bracts tipped in hooked awns. The flower itself is only about 2 millimeters long, hairy, and white in color.

External links
Jepson Manual Treatment: Chorizanthe corrugata
Chorizanthe corrugata - U.C. Photo gallery

corrugata
North American desert flora
Flora of the Southwestern United States
Flora of Baja California
Flora of Sonora
Flora of the California desert regions
Flora of the Sonoran Deserts
Natural history of the Colorado Desert
Taxa named by Asa Gray
Taxa named by John Torrey
Flora without expected TNC conservation status